Imelde Sabushimike is a Burundian politician serving as the Minister of Human Rights, Social Affairs and Gender in Burundi, appointed by the Burundi president, General Evariste Ndayimiyishe. She was the first Twa woman to be part of the Government in Burundi.

Education and background
Sabushimike earned a degree in Economics. She worked with National Commission of Internal Dialogue as a Secretary.

Career
In 2013, Sabushimike worked for an NGO called UNIPROBA (Unissons nous por la promotion des Batwa or unite for the promotion of the Batwa) founded in 2003 created to defend the rights of the Batwa community. She used this medium in helping and improving the life of the Batwa community. It was said that Imelde worked to support an ambitious development and social agenda, including education, job creation, energy etc.

References

Living people
Year of birth missing (living people)
Women government ministers of Burundi

Burundian politicians
Members of the Parliament of Burundi